"Mansard Roof" is the debut single by indie rock band Vampire Weekend, released on October 23, 2007.

Music video
"Mansard Roof" was the first song from Vampire Weekend's album to have a video. The video was filmed in Perth Amboy, New Jersey. The main scene in the video, directed by Alexis Boling, is set on a yacht and uses still frames. The Guardian writer Anna Pickard wrote a commentary about the song, discussing the song itself as "one of the happiest, summeriest songs you could ever imagine" and humorously describing the band as "a bunch of nice little boys on a sailboat having some tea and deciding to be in the sixties [...] whilst experimenting with African pop rhythms and retro shades."

Pitchfork Media writer, Mark Richardson, commented that in the video "they had some fun with their packaged image as clever Ivy League grads by embracing it completely".

Critical reception
Drowned in Sound described Koenig's vocals as sounding "as if on a day out from the institution, picking geraniums and wavering with the beauty of the world outside" and said that "whilst utterly unconvincing" that there was "something unwholesomely satisfying about it all". The single was summarised as, "unnervingly gratifying mundane schlop". Pitchfork Media described the keyboard as being "set to a perky, almost piping tone, the kind of sunny sound you'd hear in old west-African pop". Drowned in Sound decried the branding of the band as "afro-pop" and said the single was "far from the 'afro-pop' hyperbole."

Click Music described the two tracks as "beautiful, high-brow indie-pop sparklers that feel like sunshine and roll through the body like smoke expelled from Sinatra's lungs" and said that "Mansard Roof" was "jazzy and bright, trimmed with bulging afro-beats" and called "Ladies of Cambridge" "as stellar as the title-track".

Track listing
"Mansard Roof" – 2:09
"Ladies of Cambridge" – 2:39

Personnel
Vampire Weekend
Ezra Koenig
Rostam Batmanglij
Christopher Tomson
Chris Baio

Additional musicians
 Jessica Pavone – violin and viola on "Ladies of Cambridge"

Technical
 Emily Lazar – mastering on "Mansard Roof"
 George Marino – mastering on "Ladies of Cambridge"

References

External links
Vampire Weekend on XL Recordings - Album page on record label's site
"Mansard Roof" music video - as provided by record label on YouTube

2007 songs
2007 debut singles
Vampire Weekend songs
XL Recordings singles
Songs written by Chris Baio
Songs written by Ezra Koenig
Songs written by Chris Tomson
Songs written by Rostam Batmanglij